Pseudoephedrine (PSE) is a sympathomimetic drug of the phenethylamine and amphetamine chemical classes. It may be used as a nasal/sinus decongestant, as a stimulant, or as a wakefulness-promoting agent in higher doses.

It was first characterized in 1889 by the German chemists Ladenburg and Oelschlägel, who used a sample that had been isolated from Ephedra vulgaris by the Merck pharmaceutical corporation of Darmstadt, Germany.  The salts pseudoephedrine hydrochloride and pseudoephedrine sulfate are found in many over-the-counter preparations, either as a single ingredient or (more commonly) in a fixed-dose combination with one or more additional active ingredients such as antihistamines, guaifenesin, dextromethorphan, paracetamol (acetaminophen) or an NSAID (such as aspirin or ibuprofen).

Medical uses

Pseudoephedrine is a stimulant, but it is well known for shrinking swollen nasal mucous membranes, so it is often used as a decongestant. It reduces tissue hyperemia, edema, and nasal congestion commonly associated with colds or allergies. Other beneficial effects may include increasing the drainage of sinus secretions, and opening of obstructed Eustachian tubes. The same vasoconstriction action can also result in hypertension, which is a noted side effect of pseudoephedrine.

Pseudoephedrine can be used either as oral or as topical decongestant. Due to its stimulating qualities, however, the oral preparation is more likely to cause adverse effects, including urinary retention. According to one study, pseudoephedrine may show effectiveness as an antitussive drug (suppression of cough).

Pseudoephedrine is indicated for the treatment of nasal congestion, sinus congestion and Eustachian tube congestion. Pseudoephedrine is also indicated for vasomotor rhinitis, and as an adjunct to other agents in the optimum treatment of allergic rhinitis, croup, sinusitis, otitis media, and tracheobronchitis.

Pseudoephedrine is also used as a first-line prophylactic for recurrent priapism.  Erection is largely a parasympathetic response, so the sympathetic action of pseudoephedrine may serve to relieve this condition. Treatment for urinary incontinence is an off-label use ("unlabeled use") for these medications.

Adverse effects
Common adverse drug reactions (ADRs) associated with pseudoephedrine therapy include central nervous system stimulation, insomnia, nervousness, excitability, dizziness and anxiety. Infrequent ADRs include tachycardia or palpitations. Rarely, pseudoephedrine therapy may be associated with mydriasis (dilated pupils), hallucinations, arrhythmias, hypertension, seizures and ischemic colitis; as well as severe skin reactions known as recurrent pseudo-scarlatina, systemic contact dermatitis, and nonpigmenting fixed drug eruption. Pseudoephedrine, particularly when combined with other drugs including narcotics, may also play a role in the precipitation of episodes of paranoid psychosis. It has also been reported that pseudoephedrine, among other sympathomimetic agents, may be associated with the occurrence of stroke.

Precautions and contraindications
Pseudoephedrine is contraindicated in patients with diabetes mellitus, cardiovascular disease, severe or uncontrolled hypertension, severe coronary artery disease, prostatic hypertrophy, hyperthyroidism, closed angle glaucoma, or by pregnant women. The safety and effectiveness of nasal decongestant use in children is unclear.

Interactions 

Concomitant or recent (previous fourteen days) monoamine oxidase inhibitor use can lead to hypertensive reactions, including hypertensive crises.

The antihypertensive effects of methyldopa, mecamylamine, reserpine and veratrum alkaloids may be reduced by sympathomimetics. Beta-adrenergic antagonists may also interact with sympathomimetics. Increase of ectopic pacemaker activity can occur when pseudoephedrine is used concomitantly with digitalis. Antacids increase the rate of pseudoephedrine absorption, while kaolin decreases it.

Mechanism of action
Pseudoephedrine is a sympathomimetic amine. Its principal mechanism of action relies on its direct action on the adrenergic receptor system.  The vasoconstriction that pseudoephedrine produces is believed to be principally an α-adrenergic receptor response.

Pseudoephedrine acts on α- and β2-adrenergic receptors, to cause vasoconstriction and relaxation of smooth muscle in the bronchi, respectively. α-Adrenergic receptors are located on the muscles lining the walls of blood vessels. When these receptors are activated, the muscles contract, causing the blood vessels to constrict (vasoconstriction). The constricted blood vessels now allow less fluid to leave the blood vessels and enter the nose, throat and sinus linings, which results in decreased inflammation of nasal membranes, as well as decreased mucus production. Thus, by constriction of blood vessels, mainly those located in the nasal passages, pseudoephedrine causes a decrease in the symptoms of nasal congestion. Activation of β2-adrenergic receptors produces relaxation of smooth muscle of the bronchi,  causing bronchial dilation and in turn decreasing congestion (although not fluid) and difficulty breathing.

Other uses
There have been reports of off-label uses of pseudoephedrine for its stimulant properties. Long-distance truck drivers and athletes, for example, have reportedly used pseudoephedrine as a stimulant to increase their state of alertness/awareness.

A study has also found that pseudoephedrine can reduce milk production in breastfeeding women.

Manufacture of amphetamines
Its membership in the amphetamine class has made pseudoephedrine a sought-after chemical precursor in the illicit manufacture of methamphetamine and methcathinone. As a result of the increasing regulatory restrictions on the sale and distribution of pseudoephedrine, many pharmaceutical firms have reformulated, or are in the process of reformulating medications to use alternative, but less effective, decongestants, such as phenylephrine.

In the United States, federal laws control the sale of pseudoephedrine-containing products. Many retailers in the US have created corporate policies restricting the sale of pseudoephedrine-containing products. Their policies restrict sales by limiting purchase quantities and requiring a minimum age and government issued photographic identification. These requirements are similar to and sometimes more stringent than existing law. Internationally, pseudoephedrine is listed as a Table I precursor under the United Nations Convention Against Illicit Traffic in Narcotic Drugs and Psychotropic Substances.

Sports
Pseudoephedrine was on the International Olympic Committee's (IOC) banned substances list until 2004, when the World Anti-Doping Agency (WADA) list replaced the IOC list. Although WADA initially only monitored pseudoephedrine, it went back onto the "banned" list on January 1, 2010.

Pseudoephedrine is excreted through urine, and concentration in urine of this drug shows a large inter-individual spread; that is, the same dose can give a vast difference in urine concentration for different individuals. Pseudoephedrine is approved to be taken up to 240 mg per day. In seven healthy male subjects this dose yielded a urine concentration range of 62.8 to 294.4 microgram per milliliter (µg/mL) with mean ± standard deviation 149 ± 72 µg/mL. Thus, normal dosage of 240 mg pseudoephedrine per day can result in urine concentration levels exceeding the limit of 150 µg/mL set by WADA for about half of all users. Furthermore, hydration status does not affect urinary concentration of pseudoephedrine.

Canadian rower Silken Laumann was stripped of her 1995 Pan American Games team gold medal after testing positive for pseudoephedrine.

In February 2000, Elena Berezhnaya and Anton Sikharulidze won gold at the 2000 European Figure Skating Championships but were stripped of their medals after Berezhnaya tested positive. This resulted in a three-month disqualification from the date of the test, and the medal being stripped. She stated that she had taken cold medication approved by a doctor but had failed to inform the ISU as required. The pair missed the World Championships that year as a result of the disqualification.

Romanian gymnast Andreea Răducan was stripped of her gold medal at the 2000 Summer Olympic Games after testing positive. She took two pills given to her by the team coach for a cold. Although she was stripped of the overall gold medal, she kept her other medals, and, unlike in most other doping cases, was not banned from competing again; only the team doctor was banned for a number of years. Ion Ţiriac, the president of the Romanian Olympic Committee, resigned over the scandal.

In the 2010 Winter Olympic Games, the IOC issued a reprimand against the Slovak ice hockey player Lubomir Visnovsky for usage of pseudoephedrine.

In the 2014 Winter Olympic Games Team Sweden and Washington Capitals ice hockey player Nicklas Bäckström was prevented from playing in the final for usage of pseudoephedrine. Bäckström claimed he was using it as allergy medication. In March 2014, the IOC Disciplinary Commission decided that Bäckström would be awarded the silver medal. In January 2015 Bäckström, the IOC, WADA and the IIHF agreed to a settlement in which he accepted a reprimand but was cleared of attempting to enhance his performance.

Detection of use
Pseudoephedrine may be quantified in blood, plasma, or urine to monitor any possible performance-enhancing use by athletes, confirm a diagnosis of poisoning, or to assist in a medicolegal death investigation. Many commercial immunoassay screening tests directed at the amphetamines cross-react appreciably with pseudoephedrine, but chromatographic techniques can easily distinguish pseudoephedrine from other phenethylamine derivatives. Blood or plasma pseudoephedrine concentrations are typically in the 50–300 µg/L range in persons taking the drug therapeutically, 500–3000 µg/L in people with substance use disorder involving pseudoephedrine, or poisoned patients and 10–70 mg/L in cases of acute fatal overdose.

Chemistry
Pseudoephedrine is a diastereomer of ephedrine and is readily reduced into methamphetamine or oxidized into methcathinone.

Nomenclatures
The dextrorotary (+)- or d- enantiomer is (1S,2S)-pseudoephedrine, whereas the levorotating (−)- or l- form is (1R,2R)-pseudoephedrine.

In the outdated  system (+)-pseudoephedrine is also referred to as pseudoephedrine and (−)-pseudoephedrine as pseudoephedrine (in the Fisher projection then the phenyl ring is drawn at bottom).

Often the  system (with small caps) and the d/l system (with lower-case) are confused. The result is that the dextrorotary d-pseudoephedrine is wrongly named pseudoephedrine and the levorotary l-ephedrine (the diastereomer) wrongly ephedrine.

The IUPAC names of the two enantiomers are (1S,2S)- respectively (1R,2R)-2-methylamino-1-phenylpropan-1-ol. Synonyms for both are psi-ephedrine and threo-ephedrine.

Pseudoephedrine is the International Nonproprietary Name of the (+)-form, when used as pharmaceutical substance.

Society and culture

Brand names

The following is a list of consumer medicines that either contain pseudoephedrine or have switched to a less-regulated alternative such as phenylephrine.
Actifed (made by GlaxoSmithKline) — contains 60 mg pseudoephedrine and 2.5 mg triprolidine in certain countries.
Advil Cold & Sinus (made by Pfizer Canada Inc.) — contains 30 mg pseudoephedrine hydrochloride and 200 mg Ibuprofen.
Aleve-D Sinus & Cold (made by Bayer Healthcare) — contains 120 mg pseudoephedrine hydrochloride (also 220 mg naproxen).
Allegra-D (made by Sanofi Aventis) — contains 120 mg of pseudoephedrine hydrochloride (also 60 mg of fexofenadine).
Allerclear-D (made by Kirkland Signature) — contains 240 mg of pseudoephedrine sulfate (also 10 mg of loratadine).
Benadryl Plus (made by McNeil Consumer Healthcare, a Johnson & Johnson company) — contains 60 mg pseudoephedrine hydrochloride (also 8 mg acrivastine)
Cirrus (made by UCB) — contains 120 mg pseudoephedrine hydrochloride (also 5 mg cetirizine).
Claritin-D (made by Bayer Healthcare) — contains 120 mg of pseudoephedrine sulfate (also 5 mg of loratadine).
Claritin-D 24 Hour (made by Bayer Healthcare) — contains 240 mg of pseudoephedrine sulfate (also 10 mg of loratadine).
Codral (made by Asia-Pacific subsidiary of Johnson & Johnson) — Codral Original contains pseudoephedrine, Codral New Formula substitutes phenylephrine for pseudoephedrine.
Congestal (made by SIGMA Pharmaceutical Industries) — contains 60 mg pseudoephedrine hydrochloride  (also 650 mg paracetamol and 4 mg chlorpheniramine).
Contac (made by GlaxoSmithKline) — previously contained pseudoephedrine, now contains phenylephrine. As at Nov 2014 UK version still contains 30 mg pseudoephedrine hydrochloride per tablet.
Demazin (made by Bayer Healthcare) — contains pseudoephedrine sulfate and chlorpheniramine maleate
Eltor (made by Sanofi Aventis) — contains pseudoephedrine hydrochloride.
Mucinex D (made by Reckitt Benckiser) — contains 60 mg pseudoephedrine hydrochloride (also 1200 mg guaifenesin).
Nexafed (made by Acura Pharmaceuticals) — contains 30 mg pseudoephedrine per tablet, formulated with Impede Meth-Deterrent technology.
Nurofen Cold & Flu (made by Reckitt Benckiser) — contains 30 mg pseudoephedrine hydrochloride (also 200 mg ibuprofen).
Respidina – contains 120 mg of pseudoephedrine in the form of extended release tablets.
Rhinex Flash (made by Pharma Product Manufacturing, Cambodia) — contains pseudoephedrine combined with paracetamol and triprolidine.
Rhinos SR (made by Dexa Medica) — contains 120 mg of pseudoephedrine hydrochloride (also 5 mg loratadine).
Rino-Ebastel (made by Almirall) – contains 120 mg of pseudoephedrine hydrochloride (also 10 mg ebastine). 
Sinufed (made by Trima) — contains 60 mg pseudoephedrine hydrochloride.
Sinutab (made by McNeil Consumer Healthcare, a Johnson & Johnson company) — contains 500 mg paracetamol and 30 mg pseudoephedrine hydrochloride.
Sudafed Decongestant (made by McNeil Consumer Healthcare, a Johnson & Johnson company) — contains 60 mg of pseudoephedrine hydrochloride.
Theraflu (made by Novartis) — previously contained pseudoephedrine, now contains phenylephrine.
Unifed (made by United Pharmaceutical Manufacturer, Jordan) — contains pseudoephedrine hydrochloride (also triprolidine and guaifenesin).
Zyrtec-D 12 Hour (made by McNeil Consumer Healthcare, a Johnson & Johnson company) — contains 120 mg pseudoephedrine hydrochloride (also 5 mg of cetirizine).
Zephrex-D (made by Westport Pharmaceuticals) – a special meth-resistant form of pseudoephedrine that becomes gooey when heated

Legal status

Australia

Illicit diversion of pseudoephedrine in Australia has caused significant changes to the way the products are regulated. , all products containing pseudoephedrine have been rescheduled as either "Pharmacist Only Medicines" (Schedule 3) or "Prescription Only Medicines" (Schedule 4), depending on the amount of pseudoephedrine in the product. A Pharmacist Only Medicine may only be sold to the public if a pharmacist is directly involved in the transaction. These medicines must be kept behind the counter, away from public access.

Pharmacists are also encouraged (and in some states required) to log purchases with the online database Project STOP. This system aims to prevent individuals from purchasing small quantities of pseudoephedrine from many different pharmacies.

As a result, many pharmacies no longer stock Sudafed, the common brand of pseudoephedrine cold/sinus tablets, opting instead to sell Sudafed PE, a phenylephrine product that has not been proven effective in clinical trials.

Canada
Health Canada has investigated the risks and benefits of pseudoephedrine and ephedrine/Ephedra. Near the end of the study, Health Canada issued a warning on their website stating that those who are under the age of 12, or who have heart disease and may have strokes, should avoid taking pseudoephedrine and ephedrine. Also, they warned that everyone should avoid taking ephedrine or pseudoephrine with other stimulants like caffeine. They also banned all products that contain both ephedrine (or pseudoephedrine) and caffeine.

Products whose only medicinal ingredient is pseudoephedrine must be kept behind the pharmacy counter. Products containing pseudoephedrine along with other medicinal ingredients may be displayed on store shelves but may be sold only in a pharmacy when a pharmacist is present.

Colombia
The Colombian government prohibited the trade of pseudoephedrine in 2010.

Japan
Medications that contain more than 10% pseudoephedrine are prohibited under the Stimulants Control Law in Japan.

Mexico
On 23 November 2007, the use and trade of pseudoephedrine in Mexico was made illegal as it was argued that it was extremely popular as a precursor in the synthesis of methamphetamine.

Netherlands
Pseudoephedrine was withdrawn from sale in 1989 due to concerns about adverse cardiac side effects.

New Zealand
In New Zealand, pseudoephedrine is currently classified as a Class B Part II controlled drug in the Misuse of Drugs Act 1975, making it illegal to supply or possess except on prescription.

Pseudoephedrine, ephedrine, and any product containing these substances, e.g. cold and flu medicines, were first classified in October 2004 as Class C Part III (partially exempted) controlled drugs, due to being the principal ingredient in methamphetamine. New Zealand Customs and police officers continued to make large interceptions of precursor substances believed to be destined for methamphetamine production. On 9 October 2009, Prime Minister John Key announced pseudoephedrine-based cold and flu tablets would become prescription-only drugs and reclassified as a class B2 drug. The law was amended by The Misuse of Drugs Amendment Bill 2010, which passed in August 2011.

Turkey
In Turkey, medications containing pseudoephedrine are available with prescription only.

United Kingdom
In the UK, pseudoephedrine is available over the counter under the supervision of a qualified pharmacist, or on prescription. In 2007, the MHRA reacted to concerns over diversion of ephedrine and pseudoephedrine for the illicit manufacture of methamphetamine by introducing voluntary restrictions limiting over the counter sales to one box containing no more than 720 mg of pseudoephedrine in total per transaction. These restrictions became law in April 2008. No form of ID is required.

United States

Federal
The United States Congress has recognized that pseudoephedrine is used in the illegal manufacture of methamphetamine. In 2005, the Committee on Education and the Workforce heard testimony concerning education programs and state legislation designed to curb this illegal practice.

Attempts to control the sale of the drug date back to 1986, when federal officials at the Drug Enforcement Administration (DEA) first drafted legislation, later proposed by Senator Bob Dole, that would have placed a number of chemicals used in the manufacture of illicit drugs under the Controlled Substances Act. The bill would have required each transaction involving pseudoephedrine to be reported to the government, and federal approval of all imports and exports. Fearing this would limit legitimate use of the drug, lobbyists from over the counter drug manufacturing associations sought to stop this legislation from moving forward, and were successful in exempting from the regulations all chemicals that had been turned into a legal final product, such as Sudafed.

Prior to the passage of the Combat Methamphetamine Epidemic Act of 2005, sales of the drug became increasingly regulated, as DEA regulators and pharmaceutical companies continued to fight for their respective positions. The DEA continued to make greater progress in their attempts to control pseudoephedrine as methamphetamine production skyrocketed, becoming a serious problem in the western United States. When purity dropped, so did the number of people in rehab and people admitted to emergency rooms with methamphetamine in their systems. This reduction in purity was usually short lived, however, as methamphetamine producers eventually found a way around the new regulations.

Congress passed the Combat Methamphetamine Epidemic Act of 2005 ("CMEA") as an amendment to the renewal of the USA Patriot Act. Signed into law by president George W. Bush on March 6, 2006, the act amended , concerning the sale of pseudoephedrine-containing products. The law mandated two phases, the first needing to be implemented by April 8, 2006, and the second to be completed by September 30, 2006. The first phase dealt primarily with implementing the new buying restrictions based on amount, while the second phase encompassed the requirements of storage, employee training, and record keeping. Though the law was mainly directed at pseudoephedrine products it also applies to all over-the-counter products containing ephedrine, pseudoephedrine, and phenylpropanolamine, their salts, optical isomers,
and salts of optical isomers.
Pseudoephedrine was defined as a "scheduled listed chemical product" under (45(A)). The act included the following requirements for merchants ("regulated sellers") who sell such products:

 Required a retrievable record of all purchases, identifying the name and address of each party, to be kept for two years
 Required verification of proof of identity of all purchasers
 Required protection and disclosure methods in the collection of personal information
 Required reports to the Attorney General of any suspicious payments or disappearances of the regulated products
 Required training of employees with regard to the requirements of the CMEA. Retailers must self-certify as to training and compliance.
 The non-liquid dose form of regulated products may only be sold in unit dose blister packs
 Regulated products must be stored behind the counter or in a locked cabinet in such a way as to restrict public access
 Sales limits (per customer):
 Daily sales limit—must not exceed 3.6 grams of pseudoephedrine base without regard to the number of transactions
 30-day (not monthly) sales limit—must not exceed 7.5 grams of pseudoephedrine base if sold by mail order or "mobile retail vendor"
 30-day purchase limit—must not exceed 9 grams of pseudoephedrine base. (A misdemeanor possession offense under  for the person who buys it.)

In regards to the identification that may be used by an individual buying pseudoephedrine products the following constitute acceptable forms of identification:
 US passport
 Alien registration or permanent resident card
 Unexpired foreign passport with temporary I-551 stamp
 Unexpired Employment Authorization Document
 Driver's License or Government issued identification card (including Canadian driver's license)
 School ID with picture
 Voter's Registration card
 US Military Card
 Native American tribal documents

The requirements were revised in the Methamphetamine Production Prevention Act of 2008 to require that a regulated seller of scheduled listed chemical products may not sell such a product unless the purchaser:
 Presents a government issued photographic identification; and
 Signs the written logbook with their name, address, and time and date of the sale

State
Most states also have laws regulating pseudoephedrine.

The states of Alabama, Arizona, Arkansas, California, Colorado, Delaware, Florida, Georgia, Hawaii Idaho, Illinois, Indiana, Iowa, Kansas, Kentucky, Louisiana, Massachusetts, Michigan, Minnesota, Mississippi, Missouri, Montana, Nebraska, Nevada, New Jersey, North Carolina, Ohio, Oklahoma, Oregon, Pennsylvania, South Dakota, Tennessee, Texas, Utah, Vermont, Virginia, Washington, West Virginia and Wisconsin have laws requiring pharmacies to sell pseudoephedrine "behind the counter". Though the drug can be purchased without a prescription, states can limit the number of units sold and can collect personal information from purchasers.The states of Oregon and Mississippi previously required a prescription for the purchase of products containing pseudoephedrine. However as of January 1, 2022 these restrictions have been repealed  The state of Oregon reduced the number of methamphetamine lab seizures from 467 in 2004 (the final full year before implementation of the prescription only law) to a new low of 12 in 2009. The decrease in meth lab incidents in Oregon occurred largely before the prescription-only law took effect, according to a NAMSDL report titled Pseudoephedrine Prescription Laws in Oregon and Mississippi. The report posits that the decline in meth lab incidents in both states may be due to other factors: "Mexican traffickers may have contributed to the decline in meth labs in Mississippi and Oregon (and surrounding states) as they were able to provide ample supply of equal or greater quality meth at competitive prices". Additionally, similar decreases in meth lab incidents were seen in surrounding states, according to the report, and meth-related deaths in Oregon have dramatically risen since 2007. Some municipalities in Missouri have enacted similar ordinances, including Washington, Union, New Haven, Cape Girardeau and Ozark. Certain pharmacies in Terre Haute, Indiana do so as well.

Another approach to controlling the drug on the state level mandated by some state governments to control the purchases of their citizens is the use of electronic tracking systems, which require the electronic submission of specified purchaser information by all retailers who sell pseudoephedrine. Thirty-two states now require the National Precursor Log Exchange (NPLEx) to be used for every pseudoephedrine and ephedrine OTC purchase, and ten of the eleven largest pharmacy chains in the US voluntarily contribute all of their similar transactions to NPLEx. These states have seen dramatic results in reducing the number of methamphetamine laboratory seizures. Prior to implementation of the system in Tennessee in 2005, methamphetamine laboratory seizures totaled 1,497 in 2004, but were reduced to 955 in 2005, and 589 in 2009. Kentucky's program was implemented statewide in 2008, and since statewide implementation, the number of laboratory seizures has significantly decreased. Oklahoma initially experienced success with their tracking system after implementation in 2006, as the number of seizures dropped in that year and again in 2007. In 2008, however, seizures began rising again, and have continued to rise in 2009.  Nonetheless, when Oklahoma adopted NPLEx, their lab seizures also dropped significantly.

NPLEx appears to be successful by requiring the real-time submission of transactions, thereby enabling the relevant laws to be enforced at the point of sale.  By creating a multi-state database and the ability to compare all transactions quickly, NPLEx enables pharmacies to deny purchases that would be illegal based on gram limits, age, or even to convicted meth offenders in some states.  NPLEx also enforces the federal gram limits across state lines, which was impossible with state-operated systems.  Access to the records is by law enforcement agencies only, through an online secure portal.

In popular culture
In the pilot episode of Breaking Bad, Walter White first synthesizes methamphetamine through the Nagai route, using  red phosphorus and iodine to reduce pseudoephedrine.

In the episode "Vitamin D" of Glee, Terri takes a job as the school nurse to stop her husband, Will Schuester, from becoming closer to guidance counsellor Emma Pillsbury (Jayma Mays), but is fired after giving the students performance-enhancing pseudoephedrine tablets.

In her 2013 single "Avant Gardener", Australian rock musician Courtney Barnett refers to the effects of pseudoephedrine: "Reminds me of the time / When I was really sick and I / Had too much pseudoephedrine and I / Couldn't sleep at night".

In her 2017 album Melodrama, pop artist Lorde references pseudoephedrine on the song "Writer in the Dark". The lyric reads: "I still feel you, now and then / Slow like pseudoephedrine / When you see me, will you say I've changed?"

Synthesis
Although pseudoephedrine occurs naturally as an alkaloid in certain plant species (for example, as a constituent of extracts from the Ephedra species, also known as ma huang, in which it occurs together with other isomers of ephedrine), the majority of pseudoephedrine produced for commercial use is derived from yeast fermentation of dextrose in the presence of benzaldehyde. In this process, specialized strains of yeast (typically a variety of Candida utilis or Saccharomyces cerevisiae'') are added to large vats containing water, dextrose and the enzyme pyruvate decarboxylase (such as found in beets and other plants). After the yeast has begun fermenting the dextrose, the benzaldehyde is added to the vats, and in this environment the yeast converts the ingredients to the precursor l-phenylacetylcarbinol (L-PAC). L-PAC is then chemically converted to pseudoephedrine via reductive amination.

The bulk of pseudoephedrine is produced by commercial pharmaceutical manufacturers in India and China, where economic and industrial conditions favor its mass production for export.

See also 

 Amphetamine
 Carbinoxamine/pseudoephedrine
 Ephedrine
 Methamphetamine
 N-Methylpseudoephedrine
 Phenylephrine
 Phenylpropanolamine
 Thomas Latham, sponsor of the "Angie Fatino Save the Children from Meth Act"

References

External links 
 

Amphetamine alkaloids
Decongestants
Methamphetamine
Norepinephrine releasing agents
Phenylethanolamines